Greyfriars Burial Ground is an historic cemetery in Perth, Scotland, dating to 1580. It is now Category A listed.

It occupies the former location of the Greyfriars Monastery, founded by Laurence Oliphant, 1st Lord Oliphant, in 1496 and destroyed in 1559 at the start of the Scottish Reformation.

Its collection of gravestones is considered one of the best in Scotland.

As per documentation dating to 1911, "no burial is permitted of the body of a person who at the time of death resided out of the old parish, excepting that of a widower or widow, son or daughter who have never been married." A superintendent was in attendance every morning between 10 and 11 AM, then between 11 AM and 1 PM at Wellshill Cemetery.

The cemetery closed to burials in 1978.

The cemetery is located at the eastern end of Canal Street, near its junction with Tay Street. It has been extended south on two occasions, and it now abuts the bridge carrying the Perth to Dundee section of the Scottish railway network.

A tablet commemorating John Mylne, who "rebuilt the ancient bridge over the River Tay," was erected by Robert Mylne in 1784.

In 1997, when proposals were made to dismantle and rebuild the cemetery's eastern wall, two test pits were dug by the Scottish Urban Archaeological Trust (SUAT). One of the pits found what is believed to be the original monastery wall foundations. A "succession of wall foundations" hinted at several wall replacement and repair efforts undertaken during the monastery's lifespan, each raising the ground level. Medieval pottery was also discovered, likely associated with the soil of lower garden abutting the original monastery wall. The other pit demonstrated a lack of a progression of wall foundations, confirming that that area was inside the 1795 graveyard extension and outside the original monastery grounds. The second pit also showed signs of infilling or levelling layers, possibly from when a burn, which ran along the burial ground's southern wall, was covered with soil.

In 2019, several headstones deemed a hazard to passersby were removed and restored.

Notable interments
Adam Anderson, physicist (1783–1846)
George Haliburton, bishop of Dunkeld (1616–1665)
Andrew Heiton (1823–1894), architect
William Macdonald Mackenzie (1797–1856), architect
John Mylne (c. 1585–1657), mason

See also
List of listed buildings in Perth, Scotland
List of Category A listed buildings in Perth and Kinross

Gallery

References

External links

Kirkyards in Scotland
1580 establishments in Scotland
Category A listed buildings in Perth and Kinross
Listed buildings in Perth, Scotland